The Ryzza Mae Show is a Philippine television talk show broadcast by GMA Network. Hosted by Ryzza Mae Dizon, it premiered on April 8, 2013 on the network's afternoon line up. The show concluded on September 18, 2015 with a total of 636 episodes. It was replaced by Princess in the Palace in its timeslot.

Ratings
According to AGB Nielsen Philippines' Mega Manila household television ratings, the pilot episode of The Ryzza Mae Show earned a 17.5% rating. While the final episode scored a 15.5% rating.

Accolades

References

External links
 

2013 Philippine television series debuts
2015 Philippine television series endings
Filipino-language television shows
GMA Network original programming
Philippine television talk shows
Television series by TAPE Inc.